Benedikte Kiær (born 10 December 1969) is a Danish politician. From 2010 to 2011 she was Minister of Social Affairs in Lars Løkke Rasmussen's cabinet. She belongs to the Conservative People's Party.

Kiær has degrees in chemistry and political science from the University of Copenhagen.

Since 1 January 2014 she has been the mayor of Helsingør Municipality.

References

External links
 

1969 births
Living people
Conservative People's Party (Denmark) politicians
Government ministers of Denmark
University of Copenhagen alumni
21st-century Danish women politicians
Women government ministers of Denmark
Women members of the Folketing
Members of the Folketing 2011–2015
People from Gentofte Municipality
Mayors of places in Denmark